Wallerawang Power Station was a thermal coal power station, located near Wallerawang, in the Central Tablelands region of New South Wales, Australia. The power station was equipped with two turbo-alternators of  each, supplied by CA Parsons and Company of Newcastle-upon-Tyne, England. Production commenced in May 1957.

In July 2013, EnergyAustralia acquired Wallerawang Power Station, along with Mount Piper Power Station, from Delta Electricity for $160 million. Due to dwindling demand, the first of the two generating units had been mothballed in January 2013, and the second in April 2014. In November 2014, EnergyAustralia announced that it would permanently close Wallerawang due to ongoing reduced energy demand, lack of access to competitively priced coal and the power station's high operating costs. EnergyAustralia began the process of removing useful equipment from the station in 2015. The plant was finally demolished in 2021 using controlled demolition.

Features and capacity
Wallerawang A – originally built with four British Thomson-Houston  single cylinder generators, completed in 1957–1959. Wallerawang A was decommissioned in May 1986.

Wallerawang B – comprised two General Electric  2–cylinder turbines with hydrogen cooled generators completed in 1961. Wallerawang B was decommissioned in 1990.

Wallerawang C — comprised two  units were completed in 1976 and 1980. Due to dwindling energy demand, in January 2013 the NSW government-owned corporation, Delta Electricity, mothballed one of the two remaining units of Wallerawang C for twelve months.  The other was also mothballed 15 months later.

The coal for Wallerawang Power Station came from mines in the local area, delivered by private road. 75% of the coal comes from the Centennial Coal-owned Angus Place colliery.

Wallerawang Power Station drew its cooling water from Lake Wallace and Thompson's Creek dam, fresh water lakes on the Coxs River. Water from Lake Lyell and mine dewatering projects can also supply water in times of shortage. In 2007 and in 2009, water shortages occurred in the Fish River system, causing concern that the generating facility would be forced to close. Oberon Shire was also concerned about the level of potable water available from the Oberon Dam, a water cooling source for Wallerawang Power Station.

Pollutants
The Rudd government announced the introduction of a Carbon Pollution Reduction Scheme to help combat climate change that was expected to commence in 2010, however a bill to introduce the cap and trade system was defeated on the floor of the Parliament. The subsequent  was enacted and established an emissions trading scheme to price carbon in Australia in a regulated manner between from 2012 to June 2015. The carbon pricing scheme was discontinued by new federal government officials in 2014. It was expected that these measures would have impacted on emissions from power stations.

Wallerawang Power Station has emitted the following selected list of pollutants:

See also

 Mount Piper Power Station
 Rydal Dam

References

Coal-fired power stations in New South Wales
Central Tablelands
Energy infrastructure completed in 1957
1957 establishments in Australia
Demolished buildings and structures in New South Wales
Buildings and structures demolished in 2021
Buildings and structures demolished by controlled implosion